Brooksville is an unincorporated community in Blount County, Alabama, United States, located at the junction of U.S. Route 278, Alabama State Route 74, and Alabama State Route 79,  northeast of Blountsville. In 1999 Brooksville attempted to incorporate itself. Proponents of the move stated that the laws of the community would be based on the King James Bible and the Ten Commandments.

References

Unincorporated communities in Blount County, Alabama
Unincorporated communities in Alabama